The British Academy Television Award for Best Sport is one of the major categories of the British Academy Television Awards (BAFTAs), the primary awards ceremony of the British television industry. According to the BAFTA website, the category is for "the television coverage of a sporting event."

The category has gone through several changes:
 An individual award (occasionally with nominees) named Best Outside Broadcasts was presented from 1964 to 1968 and in 1977.
 From 1986 to 1991, the category was merged with the Best News Coverage category, being presented as Best News or Outside Broadcast Coverage.
 From 1995 to 1997 it was presented as Best Sports/Events Coverage in Real Time. 
 In 1998 and 1999 it was awarded as Best Live Outside Broadcast Coverage.
 From 2012 to 2015, the category for sport evens was merged with the Best Live Event category being awarded under the name Best Sport and Live Event.

Since 2016, the category is presented as a stand-alone category, separate from the Best Live Event category.

Winners and nominees

1960s
Best Outside Broadcasts

1970s
Best Outside Broadcasts

1990s
Best Sports/Events Coverage in Real Time

Best Live Outside Broadcast Coverage

2000s
Best Sport

2010s
Best Sport

Best Sport and Live Event

Best Sport

2020s

Note: The series that don't have recipients on the tables had Production team credited as recipients for the award or nomination.

References

External links
List of winners at the British Academy of Film and Television Arts

Sport